Lurdusaurus ("heavy lizard") is a genus of massive and unusually shaped iguanodont dinosaur from the Elrhaz Formation in Niger. It contains one species, L. arenatus. The formation dates to the Early Cretaceous, roughly 112 million years ago. Lurdusaurus has a highly atypical body plan for an iguanodont, with a small skull, long neck, rotund torso, and powerful forelimbs and claws, somewhat reminiscent of a ground sloth. Its metacarpals (wrist bones) are fused and reinforced into a large block, and the thumb spike is remarkably enormous. These would have allowed the hand to have functioned almost like a ball-and-chain flail.

Paleontologist Thomas R. Holtz Jr. speculated Lurdusaurus may have behaved much like a hippo. It lived in a forested, riverine environment alongside the iguanodonts Elrhazosaurus and Ouranosaurus, the sauropod Nigersaurus, an undescribed titanosaurid, the spinosaurid Suchomimus, the carcharodontosaurid Eocarcharia, the abelisaurid Kryptops, and an undescribed noasaurid. The site also yielded several crocodylomorph species and a pterosaur.

Discovery
In 1965, Philippe Taquet discovered the holotype specimen at the Gadoufaoua site of the Elrhaz Formation, in the Tenere desert of Niger. It consists of a nearly complete adult iguanodont skeleton with a fragmentary skull belonging to single individual, which was given the catalogue number MNHN GDF 1700. He noted it had rather massive proportions, and in 1976 noted it should probably be classified into a new genus while briefly describing the material. Paleontologist Souad Chabli described the remains in 1988 for her PhD thesis, under the direction of Taquet. She named it "Gravisaurus tenerensis". However, her dissertation was never published. In 1999, Turquet and American paleontologist Dale Russell published the first formal description, naming it Lurdusaurus arenatus. The generic name comes from Latin lurdus "heavy" and Ancient Greek sauros "lizard", in reference to the enormous weight of the fossils. The specific name arenatus is Latin for "sandy" because it was found in a desert. They also referred a dentary fragment, MNHN GDF 43G, and a right coracoid, GDF 381, to the species.

Description
That is, like other iguanodonts, it did not have a duck-like bill. No teeth were preserved, but MNHN GDF 43G preserves the tooth sockets for 10 tooth rows within . Based on the ratio between the length of the snout and the length of the rest of the skull in iguanodonts, the total length of the holotype's skull may have been  in life.

 
Lurdusaurus may have had 12 to 14 neck vertebrae. The neck vertebrae are about the same size as the dorsal vertebrae (the torso, before the sacrum and pelvis), whereas those of European iguanodonts 85–90% the size of the dorsals. Because Iguanodon has 28 presacral vertebrae, Lurdusaurus potentially had at least 14 dorsals. This would make the neck proportionally quite long, as long as the dorsal series. Compared to European iguanodonts, the dorsal centra are proportionally larger and have shorter neural spines (which project straight up from the centrum) and less steep transverse processes (which project up obliquely). Like all derived iguanodonts, the sternum is hatchet-shaped, with a rod-shaped projection caudolaterally (tailwards towards the side). The sacrum, based on the scars on the ilium begotten from sacral ribs, may have measured . Lurdusaurus could have had 15 proximal caudal vertebra (tail vertebrae which bear transverse processes), which would have represented a third of the entire tail series.

The headward dorsal ribs are preserved in their original positions, and show the torso was rather rotund.

The limbs are exceptionally massive and proportionally stout. The forelimbs are 60% the size of the hindlimbs. The metacarpals in the wrist were fused together into a massive block, which is also exhibited in Iguanodon, Ouranosaurus, and Camptosaurus. Like Camptosaurus but unlike derived iguanodonts, the metacarpals (except for the thumb) were short and dumbbell-like as opposed to long and narrow. Compared to Camptosaurus, the unguals (claws) are flatter. The hand features a massive thumb spike. The pelvis is proportionally short but powerful, somewhat reminiscent of a ceratopsian pelvis. The femur slightly recurves toward the midline like in ceratopsians, and is flattened anteroposteriorly (from front to back) like in sauropods. The heavily built fourth trochanter is located on the bottom half of the femur, like Iguanodon but unlike Mantellisaurus and Ouranosaurus. The tibia is incredibly short relative to the femur, respectively  vs. . The metatarsals were too short to make contact with each other, and there was likely a fleshy pad to support the weight.

Classification
In 1999, Taquet and Russell classified Lurdusaurus as a derived iguanodont or an intermediate between the iguanodonts and the more derived hadrosaurs, based on the presence of a posterolaterally orientated (towards the back and side) process on the sternum, slight tailward expansion of the pubis, a reduced posterior process of the pubis, and opisthocoelus (concave posterior ends) neck vertebrae and front dorsal vertebrae. They preliminarily placed it into the family Iguanodontidae, though conceded there is poor resolution on its higher classification, because the fourth trochanter is almost suspended off the femur like basal iguanodonts, but the neck vertebrae series is long like hadrosaurs. They were unable to satisfactorily explain the evolution of such an unusual body plan.

In 2004, British paleontologist David B. Norman placed it outside of Iguanodontidae but still within the clade Styracosterna, which he defined as containing all iguanodonts with a hatchet-like sternum and flattened hand claws. He agreed Lurdusaurus is a more derived iguanodont. In 2005, Chinese paleontologist You Hai-Lu and colleagues suggested that the newly discovered and massively built Lanzhousaurus from China was closely related to Lurdusaurus, and the former was basal to the latter. He classified both of them as basal styracosterns.

In 2008, American freelance researcher Gregory S. Paul argued that because Lanzhousaurus has a much deeper prepubic process, the two genera are probably not closely allied, though such hypotheses are wholly unverifiable without more complete remains. Paul agreed that Lurdusaurus is more basal to Iguanodontidae based on its short, broad hands and massive thumb spike, but he noted that the contemporary and more derived hadrosauriform Ouranosaurus has similar hand morphology. Therefore, Lurdusaurus could be a basal hadrosauriform, but Paul could not resolve the matter any further until more complete remains are discovered.  In 2009, American paleontologist Peter Galton placed Lurdusaurus at the base of Styracosterna and closely allied it with the Chinese Equijubus. He classified more derived iguanodonts into the new clade Iguanodontea. In 2012, Taquet agreed with Paul that it falls outside Iguanodontidae, but was also unsure how exactly Lurdusaurus relates with other iguanodonts.

Phylogeny of Iguanodontia according to Galton, 2009 (left) and You and colleagues, 2005 (right)

Paleoecology

In 2007, paleontologist Thomas R. Holtz Jr. speculated that "Lurdusaurus may have been the dinosaur equivalent to a hippo" as they both share a heavy, stocky body plan. He suggested Lurdusaurus, like the hippo, was a generally slow-moving animal on both land and water, but could reach high speeds when necessary. Generally, iguanodonts are thought to have been predominantly bipedal or facultatively bipedal, and Lurdusaurus, judging by the marked robustness of the limbs, was likely capable of quadrupedal locomotion for an extended period of time. Overall, with its unusual and massive body plan including a small skull, circular chest, powerful and clawed forearms, and flattened femora, Lurdusaurus may have been reminiscent of a ground sloth. In squatting position, it may have resembled an ankylosaur.

Taquet and Russell compared the fortified hand with its massive thumb spike to a ball-and-chain flail, and believed it was primarily used for defense.

Lurdusaurus was recovered from the Elrhaz Formation, and lived alongside the iguanodonts Ouranosaurus and Elrhazosaurus, the sauropod Nigersaurus, an undescribed titanosaurid, the spinosaurid Suchomimus, the carcharodontosaurid Eocarcharia, the abelisaurid Kryptops, and an undescribed noasaurid. The Gadoufaoua site has also yielded an ornithocheirid pterosaur, and the crocodylomorphs Anatosuchus, Araripesuchus, Stolokrosuchus, and the giant Sarcosuchus. It dates to roughly 112 million years ago during the Early Cretaceous at the Aptian–Albian boundary. Geologically, it is composed of almost entirely cross-bedded fluvial sandstone (the sediments were deposited by rivers), intermittently interrupted by migrating sand dunes. The presence of Nigersaurus suggests widespread forests with soft understory vegetation, such as immature ferns or horsetails.

See also

Koreaceratops
Liaoningosaurus
Spinosaurus

References 

Iguanodonts
Early Cretaceous dinosaurs of Africa
Aptian life
Cretaceous Niger
Fossils of Niger
Fossil taxa described in 1999
Taxa named by Philippe Taquet
Taxa named by Dale Russell
Ornithischian genera